Dave Littell (born October 25, 1953) is an American fencer. In 1972 he was an All American for Illinois. He was the Big Ten Foil Champion in 1974, and a member of the 1987 US Pan American Team. He competed in the individual and team foil events at the 1988 Summer Olympics.

References

External links
 

1953 births
Living people
American male foil fencers
Olympic fencers of the United States
Fencers at the 1988 Summer Olympics
Pan American Games medalists in fencing
Pan American Games bronze medalists for the United States
Illinois Fighting Illini fencers
Fencers at the 1987 Pan American Games